The 2009 Promotional League Final was the final event of the 2009 FEI Nations Cup Promotional League and the first Promotional League Final ever. It was held in Barcelona (Spain) on September 20, 2009 during the 2009 CSIO Barcelona. Seven teams started the competition and the team from Spain won the event. A €90,000 purse was offered at this CSIO**** competition, with each of the six competing teams receiving a share.

The two best-placed teams in this competition move into the 2010 Meydan FEI Nations Cup. The national equestrian federation of Canada refrained the start in the Meydan FEI Nations Cup second time after 2009, so also Poland moved into the Meydan FEI Nations Cup for the 2010 season.

Qualified and competing teams 
The Competing teams of the 2009 Promotional League Final were:
 from Europe (the six best-placed nations of the Promotional League Europe):
 
 
 
 
 
 form America (the best-placed nation of the Promotional League North and South America):
 

They didn't start, so  have the chance to start in the final.

Result

References 
 final ranking of the 2009 Promotional League Final, Barcelona

2009 in show jumping
Equestrian sports competitions in Spain
Meydan FEI Nations Cup
2009 in Spanish sport